The 2020 Europe's Strongest Man was a strongman competition that took place in Harrogate, England from 5–6 September 2020 at the Allerton Castle. This event was held behind closed door due to the COVID-19 pandemic.

Results of events

Event 1: Max Log Lift

Event 2: Hercules Hold
 Athlete must stand between and hold on to  pillars for as long as possible.

^ Mark Felix's time of 1m 32.37 is a new World Record.

Event 3: Hummer Hold
 Athlete must stand straight and front hold a  hummer for as long as possible.

Event 4: Loading Race
 1 x 120 kilograms (265 lb) anchor, 1 x 150 kilograms (331 lb) barrel, 1 x 150 kilograms (331 lb) sack and 1 x 120 kilograms (265 lb) tire.

Event 5: Deadlift
Weight:  for as many repetitions as possible.
Time Limit: 60 seconds
Notes: This event was completed on an axle bar. 
The athletes that finished at the last 3 places at the end of day 1 (Paul Benton, Terry Hollands and Alex Lungu) were taken out of the rest of the competition.

Event 6: Stone Press
Weight: 100 kilograms (220 lb) atlas stone for as many repetitions as possible.
Time Limit 75 seconds.

Event 7: Nicol Stones Carry
Weight: 138 kilograms (304 lb) stone on the right hand and 114 kilograms (251 lb) stone on the left hand for longest distance.
Athletes get 10 seconds for a second pick-up after dropping the stones for the first time.

Event 8: Keg Toss

Event 9: Atlas Stones

Final Results

References

External links 

Competitions in the United Kingdom
Europe's Strongest Man